Goodenia nuda is a species of flowering plant in the family Goodeniaceae and is endemic to the Pilbara region of Western Australia. It is an erect to ascending herb with elliptic to lance-shaped leaves at the base of the plant, and racemes of yellow flowers.

Description
Flowering mainly occurs from April to August and the fruit is an oval to spherical capsule  in diameter.

Taxonomy and naming
Goodenia muelleriana was first formally described in 1905 by Ernst Georg Pritzel in the journal Botanische Jahrbücher für Systematik, Pflanzengeschichte und Pflanzengeographie from a specimen collected near Roebourne. The original specimens have been lost, but in 1990 Roger Charles Carolin selected the specimens he collected near Onslow as the neotype. The specific epithet (nuda) means "naked" or "bare", referring to the sparsely-leaved stems.

Distribution
This goodenia grows in the Gascoyne, Little Sandy Desert and Pilbara biogeographic regions in the north-west of Western Australia.

Conservation status
Goodenia muelleriana is classified as "Priority Four" by the Government of Western Australia Department of Parks and Wildlife, meaning that is rare or near threatened.

References

nuda
Eudicots of Western Australia
Plants described in 1905
Taxa named by Ernst Pritzel
Endemic flora of Australia